Judomaster is the name of several superheroes appearing in American comic books published by DC Comics.

An unidentified incarnation of Judomaster appears in the DC Extended Universe television series Peacemaker, played by Nhut Le.

Fictional character biography

Hadley Jagger

Judomaster's secret identity was Hadley "Rip" Jagger, a sergeant in World War II in the United States Army. He rescued the daughter of a Pacific island chief and in return was taught the martial art of judo. He had a kid sidekick named Tiger. In the Nightshade backup series in Captain Atom, an adult Tiger was Nightshade's martial arts instructor.

Judomaster's title lasted from #89 to #98, from June, 1966 to December 1967. It was a retitling of Gunmaster, which was itself a retitling of Six-Gun Heroes.

Along with most Charlton Comics superhero characters, the rights to Judomaster were sold to DC Comics. In post-Crisis continuity, Judomaster was said to be a member of the All-Star Squadron, DC's team of superheroes during World War II, although he has never appeared in an actual published story as a member of the team. His kid sidekick, Tiger, would later become the villain Avatar in the L.A.W. miniseries published by DC Comics, which re-teamed the Charlton characters that had been acquired by DC. In the same series it is shown Judomaster has lived for some time in the fictional city of Nanda Parbat. As time passes in a different manner there, Judomaster has retained a younger form. Since the miniseries, Judomaster has only appeared a few times.

Sometime in his life, he had a son named Thomas Jagger.

Judomaster was killed when he took part in the giant battle of Metropolis during the "Infinite Crisis" storyline during which the supervillain Bane broke his back.

Unnamed

Andreas Havoc, an enemy of Thunderbolt, challenged Thunderbolt to battle, feeling that his rightful position as "Vajra" had been stolen by him. The Blue Beetle, Captain Atom, and Nightshade assisted Thunderbolt in battling Havoc in a psychic battle while the new Judomaster helped rescue the heroes in the physical world.

He later appeared as attending a memorial service for the citizens of Star City.

Thomas Jagger

Thomas "Tommy" Jagger is the son of Hadley Jagger, from whom he inherited the name Judomaster. Jagger is also one of Checkmate's top field agents, within which he is known as the White Knight, and is an openly gay man.

Jagger is conflicted when Checkmate becomes involved in the elections of Santa Prisca at the request of the United Nations. Bane, his father's killer, is suspected of ballot stuffing, intimidation, and falsifying election results. Jagger volunteers for the mission and is turned down by White King/Mr. Terrific. Josephine Tautin, the Black Queen's Knight, is picked, but a medical emergency prevents her from going. Reluctantly, Mr. Terrific agrees to Jagger's deployment, along with Fire. The mission is complicated by Fire when she acts on orders secretly given to her by Amanda Waller that results in Bane's direct intervention with Jagger. He resists the desire to avenge his father for honor, but does manage to beat Bane in a fight. The two agents make it to their exfiltration point and return to Checkmate headquarters where Jagger informs the Royals of Fire's sabotage.

Jagger also spent time as an undercover Kobra devotee.

Sonia Sato

A female Judomaster, Sonia Sato, was recruited by Oracle to break into a Mexican prison. In keeping with the theme of the Birds of Prey group, this Judomaster, unlike the others, is female.

Sonia's metahuman talent allows her to project an "aversion field" which prevents her from being hit by attacks specifically aimed at her. This does not include attacks that have no aim, such as random projectiles and explosions. With the help of the Justice Society of America, she stops Yakuza assassins led by Tiger. In her earlier Birds of Prey appearance, Sonia Sato is shown having an above-average mastery of English, allowing her to communicate effortlessly. During her Justice Society of America tenure, she's shown as unable to speak English, learning only with great difficulties to master a stilted, somewhat impaired command on the language. She is shown in a relationship with Damage, kissing him even after his temporarily healed face was reverted to his heavily scarred one.

Sonia's romance with Damage is ended when he is killed by the reanimated Jean Loring during Blackest Night. Now part of Magog's All-Star Justice Society of America squadron, Sonia assists her teammates in repelling the Black Lantern invasion of Manhattan. Sonia and Atom Smasher search the city for survivors, only to stumble upon Damage, now a member of the Black Lantern Corps, tearing the heart out of a police officer.

After the end of the Blackest Night a greatly distraught and grieving Judomaster plans to revert to her earlier plan of vengeance against Tiger, her father's killer, feeling that without Damage's love she has nothing else to anchor to a happier life. She's stopped by King Chimera, who relays her the missing half of Damage's last message to her, recorded before the Blackest Night, in which Grant shares with Sonia his wish to have corrective surgery on his face and build a simpler, happier life with her, wishing Sonia, in the event of his death, a better life. Thus King Chimera is able to convince Sonia to enact Grant's last wishes by leaving Tiger alive (albeit with a severe beating). Furthermore, Sonia decides to improve her English (reasoning that only Damage was kind enough to bear her stilted, slow grasp of language), and after giving her lover a tearful eulogy, she begins to finance several relief funds for the people Damage has unwillingly hurt in the years, attempting to give him closure, using money she "requisitioned" from Tiger before having him incarcerated.

In the Watchmen sequel Doomsday Clock, Judomaster appears as a member of Japan's superhero team called Big Monster Action.

Other versions
 A female version was seen in Alex Ross and Mark Waid's comic Kingdom Come, as a member of Magog's Justice Battalion, along with the rest of the Charlton 'Action Heroes'. She was apparently killed with the other members when Captain Atom was killed.
 In the final issue of 52, a new Multiverse is revealed, originally consisting of 52 identical realities. Among the parallel realities shown is one designated "Earth-4". As a result of Mister Mind "eating" aspects of this reality, it takes on visual aspects similar to the pre-Crisis Earth-4, including Judomaster and the other Charlton characters. The names of the characters are not mentioned in the panel in which they appear, the Judomaster is visually similar to the Rip Jagger Judomaster. Based on comments by Grant Morrison, this alternate universe is not the pre-Crisis Earth-4.
 A version of Sonia Sato appears in Earth 2 #9 as part of "The New 52", a reboot of the DC Comics storyline. Alongside other parallel versions of former JSA members (namely Wesley Dodds a.k.a. Sandman) that reside on Earth 2, Major Sonia Sato of the World Army appears at the home of Jay Garrick's mother in an attempt to apprehend Jay. She is seen wearing a sigil designating her as a representative of the nation of Japan.

In other media

Television
 Sonia Sato appears in the Stargirl episode "Summer School: Chapter Ten", portrayed by Kristen Lee. This version is a Blue Valley citizen who runs a coffee stand.
 An unidentified Judomaster appears in Peacemaker, portrayed by Nhut Le. This version works as a bodyguard for United States Senator Royland Goff and allies himself with the "Butterflies", parasitic aliens secretly led by Goff.

Film
 Rip Jagger appears in Batman: Soul of the Dragon, voiced by Chris Cox. This version is a student of O-Sensei alongside Shiva, Richard Dragon, Jade, Ben Turner, and Bruce Wayne stationed in Nanda Parbat. Secretly a member of the Kobra cult, he kills Jade to unleash Nāga from his mystical dimension, but is devoured by Nāga's demonic servants.

References

External links
 
 
 
 Judomaster & Tiger at the International Catalogue of Superheroes
 Judomaster at Don Markstein's Toonopedia. Archived from the original on October 25, 2011.
 Entry on Judomaster & Tiger
 Index to the Earth-4 adventures of the Charlton Action Heroes

1966 comics debuts
Characters created by Joe Gill
Charlton Comics superheroes
Charlton Comics titles
Comics characters introduced in 1965
Comics characters introduced in 2007
DC Comics female superheroes
DC Comics LGBT superheroes
DC Comics martial artists
DC Comics metahumans
DC Comics superheroes
Fictional gay males
Fictional judoka
Fictional World War II veterans
Martial arts comics